Members of the Bavarian Maximilian Order for Science and Art, awarded to acknowledge and reward excellent and outstanding achievements in the fields of science and art.  It is based in Bavaria, Germany.

Members

1853–1932 
 1853
 Science: Andreas von Baumgartner († 1865), August Boeckh († 1867), Johann Caspar Bluntschli († 1881), Joseph Andreas Buchner († 1854), Friedrich Creuzer († 1858), Ignaz von Döllinger († 1890), Wilhelm von Dönniges († 1872), Christian Gottfried Ehrenberg († 1876), Carl Friedrich Eichhorn († 1854), Johann Franz Encke († 1865), Johann Nepomuk Fuchs († 1856), Carl Friedrich Gauß († 1855), Jacob Grimm († 1863), Joseph von Hammer-Purgstall († 1856), Friedrich von Hermann († 1868), Carl Friedrich Hermann († 1855), Alexander von Humboldt († 1859), Justus von Liebig († 1873), Carl von Martius († 1868), Hugo von Mohl († 1872), Johannes Müller († 1858), Georg Simon Ohm († 1854), Leopold Ranke († 1886), Friedrich von Raumer († 1873), Carl Ritter († 1859), Friedrich Carl von Savigny († 1861), Friedrich Wilhelm von Schelling († 1854), Friedrich Christoph Schlosser († 1861), Gotthilf Heinrich von Schubert († 1860), Carl Theodor von Siebold († 1885), Carl August von Steinheil († 1870), Friedrich Wilhelm von Thiersch († 1860), Friedrich Wöhler († 1882), Ferdinand Wolf († 1866)
 Art: Albrecht Adam († 1862), Anton von Auersperg (Anastasius Grün) († 1876), Peter von Cornelius († 1867), Sebastian von Daxenberger (Karl Fernau) († 1878), Franz von Dingelstedt († 1881), Joseph von Eichendorff († 1857), Emanuel von Geibel († 1884), Franz Grillparzer († 1872), Heinrich Hess († 1863), Peter Hess († 1871), Wilhelm von Kaulbach († 1874), Leo von Klenze († 1864), Franz von Kobell († 1882), Franz Lachner († 1890), Carl Friedrich Lessing († 1880), Heinrich Marschner († 1861), Giacomo Meyerbeer († 1864), Johann Friedrich Overbeck († 1869), Christian Rauch († 1857), Ernst Rietschel († 1861), Friedrich Rückert († 1866), Julius Schnorr von Carolsfeld († 1872), Johann von Schraudolph († 1879), Karl Simrock († 1876), Louis Spohr († 1859), August Stüler († 1865), August von Voit († 1870), Joseph Christian von Zedlitz († 1862), Friedrich Ziebland († 1873)
 1854
 Science: Christian August Brandis († 1867), Eilhard Mitscherlich († 1863), Karl Gustav Homeyer († 1874), Johann von Lamont († 1879), Adolf Friedrich von Schack († 1894)
 Art: Justinus Kerner († 1862)
 1855
 Science: Gustav Lejeune-Dirichlet († 1859), Friedrich Diez († 1876)
 1857
 Science: Wilhelm von Haidinger († 1871), Friedrich Gottlieb Welcker († 1868), Heinrich von Sybel († 1895), Christian Lassen († 1876)
 1858
 Science: Theodor von Bischoff († 1882), Immanuel Bekker († 1871)
 Art: Moritz von Schwind († 1871), Moritz Hauptmann († 1868)
 1859
 Science: Georg Heinrich Pertz († 1876), Max von Pettenkofer († 1901), Wilhelm Weber († 1891)
 Art: Friedrich Hitzig († 1881), Hans Christian Andersen († 1875)
 1860
 Science: Ludwig von Döderlein († 1863), Jacob Henle († 1885)
 Art: Friedrich Hebbel († 1863), Gustav Freytag († 1895)
 1861
 Science: Hieronymus von Bayer († 1876), Carl Georg von Wächter († 1880), Ludwig Häusser († 1867)
 Art: Ernst Hähnel († 1891)
 1862
 Art: Eligius von Münch-Bellinghausen (Friedrich Halm) († 1871), Ernst Deger († 1885), Ferdinand Hiller († 1885), Eduard Mörike († 1875)
 1863
 Science: Hermann Kopp († 1892), Wilhelm Wackernagel († 1869)
 Art: Friedrich von Bodenstedt († 1892), August Riedel († 1883)
 1864
 Art: Oskar von Redwitz († 1891)
 1865
 Science: Wilhelm von Giesebrecht († 1889), Robert Bunsen († 1899), Franz Bopp († 1867)
 1866
 Science: Friedrich Ritschl († 1876), Wilhelm Roscher († 1894), Hermann von Helmholtz († 1894)
 Art: Carl von Piloty († 1886), Bonaventura Genelli († 1868)
 1867
 Science: Georg Ludwig von Maurer († 1872), Leonhard von Spengel († 1880), Christoph Friedrich von Stälin († 1873), Heinrich Leberecht Fleischer († 1888)
 Art: Ludwig Knaus († 1910)
 1869
 Science: Heinrich Wilhelm Dove († 1879), Robert von Mohl († 1875), Richard Lepsius († 1884)
 Art: Karl Schnaase († 1875), Friedrich Preller († 1878)
 1870
 Science: Georg Waitz († 1886), August Wilhelm von Hofmann († 1892)
 Art: Friedrich Drake († 1882)
 1871
 Science: Gustav Rose († 1873), Theodor Mommsen († 1903), Ferdinand Gregorovius († 1891)
 Art: Johann Heinrich Strack († 1873), Paul Heyse (resigned 1887, † 1914), Andreas Achenbach († 1910), Wilhelm Heinrich von Riehl († 1897)
 1872
 Science: Hermann Kolbe († 1884), Franz Neumann († 1895), Paul von Roth († 1892)
 Art: Fritz Reuter († 1874)
 1873
 Science: Carl Ernst von Baer († 1876), Emil Du Bois-Reymond († 1896)
 Art: Richard Wagner († 1883), Johannes Brahms († 1897), August von Kreling († 1876), Gottfried von Neureuther († 1887)
 1874
 Science: Alexander Braun († 1877), Ernst Eduard Kummer († 1893)
 Art: Adolph von Menzel († 1905), Johannes Schilling († 1910), Hermann von Lingg († 1905), Joseph Victor von Scheffel († 1886)
 1875
 Science: Friedrich Max Müller († 1900), Ernst von Brücke († 1892)
 Art: Theophilos von Hansen († 1891)
 1876
 Science: Friedrich von Spiegel († 1905), Konrad von Maurer († 1902), Carl von Hegel († 1901), Ludwig von Seidel († 1896)
 Art: Berthold Auerbach († 1882), Gottfried Keller († 1890), Franz von Lenbach († 1904)
 1877
 Science: Carl Wilhelm von Nägeli († 1891), Gustav Kirchhoff († 1887), Carl von Halm († 1882), Johann Gustav Droysen († 1884)
 1878
 Science: Carl Ludwig († 1895)
 Art: Franz Defregger († 1921), Reinhold Begas († 1911), Robert Franz († 1892)
 1879
 Science: Christian August Friedrich Peters († 1880), Albert von Kölliker († 1905)
 Art: Ludwig Passini († 1903)
 1880
 Science: Georg Curtius († 1885), Wilhelm von Planck († 1900)
 Art: Arnold Böcklin († 1901), Heinrich von Ferstel († 1883)
 1881
 Science: Eduard Zeller († 1908)
 Art: Eduard von Bauernfeld († 1890), Heinrich Laube († 1884), Julius Raschdorff († 1914)
 1882
 Science: Wilhelm von Gümbel († 1898), Heinrich von Brunn († 1894), Konrad Bursian († 1883)
 Art: Theodor Storm († 1888)
 1883
 Science: Karl von Prantl († 1888), Karl von Voit († 1908)
 Art: Friedrich von Schmidt († 1891), Edward von Steinle († 1886)
 1884
 Science: Max Duncker († 1886), Ernst Curtius († 1896)
 Art: Adolph von Wilbrandt († 1911), Franz Liszt († 1886), Alfred von Meißner († 1885)
 1885
 Science: Franz von Miklosich († 1891), Karl Weierstraß († 1897), Carl Gegenbaur († 1903), Rudolf Clausius († 1888)
 Art: Eduard von Gebhardt († 1925), Friedrich Spielhagen († 1911)
 1887
 Science: Alfred von Arneth († 1897), Julius Ficker († 1902)
 Art: Caspar von Zumbusch († 1915), Adolf von Hildebrand († 1921), Friedrich August von Kaulbach († 1920), Anton von Werner († 1915)
 1888
 Science: Julius von Sachs († 1897), Albrecht Weber († 1901), August Friedrich Kekulé († 1896)
 Art: Conrad Ferdinand Meyer († 1898), Joseph Rheinberger († 1901)
 1889
 Art: Wilhelm von Diez († 1907)
 1891
 Science: Adolf von Baeyer († 1917)
 Art: Herman Grimm († 1901)
 1892
 Science: Carl Adolph Cornelius († 1903), Arthur von Auwers († 1915), Rudolf Leuckart († 1898), Fridolin von Sandberger († 1898)
 Art: Ferdinand von Miller († 1929), Max Bruch († 1920), Wilhelm von Hertz  († 1902), Rudolf von Seitz († 1910)
 1893
 Science: Nathanael Pringsheim († 1894)
 Art: Friedrich von Thiersch († 1921), Georg von Hauberrisser († 1922), Ludwig von Löfftz († 1910)
 1894
 Science: Wilhelm von Christ († 1906), Karl von Zittel († 1904), August Weismann († 1914)
 1895
 Science: Wilhelm Pfeffer († 1920)
 Art: Hubert von Herkomer († 1914), Adolf Oberländer († 1923), Gabriel von Max († 1915)
 1896
 Science: Friedrich Kohlrausch († 1910), Heinrich Brunner († 1915), Wilhelm Wattenbach († 1897)
 Art: Wilhelm von Rümann († 1906)
 1897
 Science: Otto Ribbeck († 1898), Gustav Wiedemann († 1899), Simon Schwendener († 1919)
 Art: Joseph Joachim († 1907)
 1898
 Science: Ernst Kuhn († 1920), Emil Fischer († 1919), Felix Klein († 1925), Karl Wilhelm von Kupffer († 1902), Karl Weinhold († 1901)
 Art: Joseph Brandt († 1915)
 1899
 Science: Ludwig Boltzmann († 1906), Ferdinand von Richthofen († 1905)
 Art: Wilhelm Raabe († 1910), Gabriel von Seidl († 1913)
 1900
 Science: August von Bechmann († 1907), Karl Theodor von Heigel († 1915), Hugo von Seeliger († 1924)
 1901
 Science: Eduard von Wölfflin († 1908), Wilhelm Conrad Röntgen († 1923), Jakobus Hendrikus van ’t Hoff († 1911)
 Art: Karl von Perfall († 1907), Hans von Hopfen († 1904)
 1902
 Science: Karl von Amira († 1930), Theodor von Sickel († 1908), Wilhelm Hittorf († 1914)
 Art: Hans Thoma († 1924), Franz von Stuck († 1928), Fritz von Uhde († 1911)
 1903
 Science: Sigmund von Riezler († 1900), Theodor Nöldeke († 1930), Ernst Abbe († 1905), Karl Neumann († 1925)
 1904
 Science: Ferdinand Zirkel († 1912), Hermann Usener († 1905)
 Art: Carl Hocheder († 1917), Friedrich von Miller († 1921), Heinrich von Zügel († 1941)
 1905
 Science: Ernst Mach († 1916), Ferdinand von Lindemann († 1939), Ulrich von Wilamowitz-Moellendorff († 1931)
 1906
 Science: Adolf Furtwängler († 1907), Karl Krumbacher († 1909), Paul von Groth († 1927), Hermann Carl Vogel († 1907)
 Art: Albert von Keller († 1920), Alfred Messel († 1909), Wilhelm Jensen († 1911)
 1907
 Science: Hermann Paul († 1921), David Hilbert († 1943), Carl von Linde († 1934)
 Art: Max Zenger († 1911), Hans Grässel († 1939), Louis Tuaillon († 1919)
 1908
 Science: Gustav Schmoller († 1917), Vatroslav Jagić († 1923), Wilhelm Wundt († 1920), Carl Justi († 1912)
 Art: Ludwig von Herterich († 1932)
 1909
 Science: Adolf von Harnack († 1930), Robert Koch († 1910)
 Art: Hugo von Habermann († 1929), Ludwig Hoffmann († 1932)
 1910
 Science: Otto Crusius († 1918), Richard von Hertwig († 1937)
 Art: Leo Samberger († 1949), Max Klinger († 1920), Richard Strauss († 1949)
 1911
 Science: Aurel Voss († 1931), Karl von Goebel († 1932), Ewald Hering († 1918)
 Art: Gustav Schönleber († 1917), Fritz Boehle († 1916), Emanuel von Seidl († 1919), Angelo Jank († 1940), Gerhart Hauptmann († 1946)
 1912
 Science: Paul Ehrlich († 1915), Emil Warburg († 1931), Richard Schröder († 1917)
 Art: Adolph Hengeler († 1927), Joseph Wenglein († 1919), Anton von Stadler († 1917)
 1913
 Science: Friedrich Kluge († 1926), Karl Binding († 1920), Theodor Boveri († 1915), Otto Bütschli († 1920)
 Art: Gotthardt Kühl († 1915), Hermann Hahn († 1942)

 1925
 Science: Eduard Schwartz († 1940), Max Planck († 1947), Richard Willstätter († 1942), Wilhelm Wien († 1928)
 Art: Max Liebermann († 1935), Max Slevogt († 1932), Theodor Fischer († 1938), German Bestelmeyer († 1942)
 1926
 Art: Hans Pfitzner († 1949)
 1927
 Science: Georg Dehio († 1932), Adolf Erman († 1937), Edward Schröder († 1942), Oswald Redlich († 1944)
 Art: Julius Diez († 1957), Leopold von Kalckreuth († 1928)
 1928
 Science: Lujo Brentano († 1931), Erich von Drygalski († 1949)
 Art: Bernhard Bleeker († 1968), Fritz Erler († 1940)
 1929
 Art: Hugo Lederer († 1940)
 1930
 Science: Max Rubner († 1932), Paul Wolters († 1936)
 Art: Paul Ernst († 1933), Joseph Wackerle († 1959)
 1931
 Science: Kurt Sethe († 1934), Jakob Wackernagel († 1938), Walther von Dyck († 1934), Arnold Sommerfeld († 1951), Max Lenz († 1932)
 1932
 Science: Carl Correns († 1933), Theodor Wiegand († 1936), Aloys Schulte († 1941)
 Art: Oswald Bieber († 1955), Max Feldbauer († 1948)

Since 1980 
 1981
 Science: Klaus Betke († 2011), Adolf Butenandt († 1995), Ernst Otto Fischer († 2007), Karl Ritter von Frisch († 1982), Walter Künneth († 1997), Heinz Maier-Leibnitz († 2000), Golo Mann († 1994), Theodor Maunz († 1993), Max Spindler († 1986)
 Art: Axel von Ambesser († 1988), August Arnold († 1983), Werner Egk († 1983), Josef Henselmann († 1987), Eugen Jochum († 1987), Carl Orff († 1982), Heinz Rühmann († 1994), Hans Sedlmayr († 1984), Toni Stadler († 1982), Astrid Varnay († 2006)
 1984
 Science: Hansjochem Otto Autrum († 2003), Bernhard Bischoff († 1991), Ludwig Bölkow († 2003), Karl Bosl († 1993), Ludwig Demling († 1995), Ulrich Grigull († 2003), Hermann Heimpel († 1988), Rolf Huisgen, Bernhard Ilschner († 2006), Konrad Lorenz († 1989), Reimar Lüst, Rudolf Mößbauer († 2011), Oswald von Nell-Breuning († 1991), Lothar Rohde († 1985), Michael Schmaus († 1993), Günter Schmölders († 1991), Julius Speer († 1984), Konrad Zuse († 1995)
 Art: Elisabeth Bergner († 1986), Kurt Böhme († 1989), Georg Brenninger († 1988), Bernhard Degenhart († 1999), Dietrich Fischer-Dieskau († 2012), Rudolf Hartmann († 1988), Hans Hartung († 1989), Ludwig Hoelscher († 1996), Hans Egon Holthusen († 1997), Hans Hotter († 2003), Wilhelm Kempff († 1991), Wolfgang Sawallisch († 2013), Wolfgang Wagner († 2010), Maria Wimmer († 1996), Mac Zimmermann († 1995)
 1986
 Science: Gustav Aufhammer († 1988), Friedrich Ludwig Bauer († 2015), Walter Bruch († 1990), Herbert Franke († 2011), Georges Köhler († 1995), Kurt Magnus († 2003), Hans Raupach († 1997), Audomar Scheuermann († 2000), Eugen Ulmer († 1988)
 Art: Marianne Hoppe († 2002), Ernst Jünger († 1998), Theodor Müller  († 1996), Rudolf Noelte († 2002), Josef Oberberger († 1994), Hermann Prey († 1998), Sir Georg Solti († 1997), Hans Wimmer († 1992)
 1988
 Science: Hans-Georg Beck († 1999), Otto Braun-Falco  († 2018), Wolfgang Clemen († 1990), Klaus von Klitzing, Peter Lerche († 2014)
 Art: Erich Steingräber († 2013)
 1991
 Science: Otto L. Lange († 2017), Otto Meitinger († 2017), Heinrich Nöth († 2015), Hans Georg Zachau († 2017)
 Art: Günter Bialas († 1995), Alexander von Branca († 2011), Harald Genzmer († 2007), Werner Haftmann († 1999), Ernst Maria Lang († 2014)
 1993
 Science: Heinrich Fries († 1998), Wolfgang Haber, Robert Huber, Hans Maier, Anton Spitaler († 2003)
 Art: Sergiu Celibidache († 1996), Heinz Friedrich († 2004), Rupprecht Geiger († 2009), Wilhelm Killmayer († 2017), Fritz Koenig († 2017), Hermann Lenz († 1998), Konstanze Vernon († 2013)
 1995
 Science: Wolfgang Kaiser, Wolfhart Pannenberg († 2014), Joseph Kardinal Ratzinger, Willibald Sauerländer († 2018), Otto Speck, Hans F. Zacher († 2015)
 Art: Martin Benrath († 2000), Vicco von Bülow († 2011), Brigitte Fassbaender, Hertha Töpper († 2020), Martin Walser
 1998
 Science: Heinz Bauer († 2002), Gerd Binnig, Roland Bulirsch, Horst Fuhrmann, Eveline Gottzein, Martin Lindauer († 2008)
 Art: Rolf Boysen, Lothar-Günther Buchheim († 2007), Tankred Dorst, August Everding († 1999), Hans Werner Henze († 2012), Carlos Kleiber († 2004), Julia Varady
 1999
 Science: Knut Borchardt, Wolfgang Frühwald, Regine Kahmann, Arnulf Schlüter († 2011), Harald Weinrich, Ernst-Ludwig Winnacker, Meinhart Zenk
 Art: Sir Colin Davis († 2013), Edita Gruberová († 2021), Thomas Holtzmann, Friedhelm Kemp († 2011), Elfriede Kuzmany († 2006), Martha Mödl († 2001), Doris Schade, Wieland Schmied, Gisela Stein († 2009)
 2001
 Science: Adolf Birkhofer, Hans Blömer, Eva-Bettina Bröcker, Franz Mayinger, Klaus Pinkau, Hubert Ziegler († 2009)
 Art: Dieter Dorn, Reiner Kunze, Waltraud Meier, Anne-Sophie Mutter, Robert Spaemann († 2018), Ruth Zechlin († 2007)
 2003
 Science: Eugen Biser, Theodor Hänsch, Berthold Hölldobler, Elke Lütjen-Drecoll, Trutz Rendtorff, Albrecht Struppler († 2009)
 Art: Hans-Busso von Busse († 2009), Ruth Drexel († 2009), Aribert Reimann, Horst Stein († 2008)
 2006
 Science: Heinz Billing († 2017), Claus-Wilhelm Canaris († 2021), Dieter Henrich, Volker ter Meulen, Maria-Elisabeth Michel-Beyerle, Dieter Seitzer
 Art: Cornelia Froboess, Kurt Moll († 2017), Jürgen Rose
 2008
 Science:  Laetitia Boehm, Walter Neupert, Hans-Werner Sinn, Paul Zanker
 Art: Reinhold Baumstark, Sir Peter Jonas († 2020), Zubin Mehta
 2010
 Science: Gisela Anton, Harald zur Hausen, Joachim Milberg, Reinhard Rummel, Hubert Schmidbaur, Markus Schwaiger, Anna-Elisabeth Trappe
 Art: Diana Damrau, Wilfried Hiller, Mariss Jansons († 2019), Otfried Preußler († 2013), Klaus Schultz
 2012
 Science: Manfred Broy, Heinz Gerhäuser, Peter Gruss, Jörg Hacker, Wolfgang A. Herrmann, Doris Schmitt-Landsiedel
 Art: Siegfried Jerusalem, Ivan Liška, Siegfried Mauser, Herta Müller
 2014
 Science: August Böck, Gerhard Ertl, Gerhard Hirzinger, Paul Kirchhof, Christian Meier, Christiane Nüsslein-Volhard
 Art: Anita Albus, Sibylle Canonica, Jens Malte Fischer, Christian Gerhaher, Gerhard Oppitz, Wolfgang Rihm
 2016
 Science: Lorraine Daston, Dieter Oesterhelt
 Art: Peter Gülke, Brigitte Kronauer († 2019), Edgar Reitz
 2018
 Science: , Laurens Molenkamp, Petra Schwille, Barbara Stollberg-Rilinger
 Art: Jonas Kaufmann, Norbert Miller, Jörg Widmann, Michael Haneke
 2021
 Science: Reinhard Genzel

Rejection 
 1853: Ludwig Uhland

References 

Bavaria-related lists
B
B
Bavarian Maximilian Order for Science and Art